Nea and Neea are Finnish female given names.

The name has been in the Finnish Almanac since 1995, but the name has been considerably in use much earlier. At the end of 2015 according to the Population Register Center, approximately 7,140 women have been named Nea and 3,110 women have been named Neea.

Nea and Neea are shortened versions of Linnea which is a female given name of Swedish origin. The name Linnea is linked to the famous 18th-century Swedish scientist Carl Linnaeus, who was ennobled as Carl von Linné later in life.

August 3 is the official name day for Nea, Neea, Linnea and Vanamo.

People named Nea
 Nea Marshall Kudi Ngwa, Cameroonian-American drag queen
 Nea Morin (née Barnard) (1905–1986), British rock and mountain climber
 Nea-Stina Liljedahl (born 1993), Finnish football player

Fictional characters
 Nea D. Campbell, fictional character in D.Gray-man manga
 Nea Kivi, protagonist of Merja Jalo's "Nea" book series
 Nea Karlsson, survivor in the video game, Dead By Daylight

See also

Nela (name)
Nia (given name)

Sources 

Finnish feminine given names